Space In Your Face is the second studio album from heavy metal band Galactic Cowboys. It is the band's final album for DGC Records, who pulled the band's touring support shortly after the album's release.

Trivia
 The man on the cover of "Space In Your Face" is David Kitchens, former ranch hand for singer Ben Huggins’ brother-in-law, as he was the only person they could find who fit in the suit.
 During the song "Where Are You Now?", you can hear a scripted phone conversation between bassist Monty Colvin, his wife (at the time) and singer Ben Huggins' wife.
 There are two hidden tracks on this album; "Ranch on Mars" and "Still Life of Peace". These two tracks were hidden so the band could include two more tracks than Geffen wanted.
 Ben Huggins regards Space In Your Face, along with At the End of the Day, as the band's high point.
 The album has sold 31,061 copies as of January 2000, according to Nielsen Soundscan.

Track listing

Personnel
Ben Huggins - Vocals, acoustic guitar, blues harp
Dane Sonnier - Guitar, vocals
Monty Colvin - Bass, vocals 
Alan Doss - Drums, vocals
Andy Wallace - Mixing

Guest Musicians
 Max Dyer - cello
 Fletch Wiley - trumpet

References

http://www.allmusic.com/album/space-in-your-face-mw0000099587

External links
Space In Your Face lyrics

1993 albums
Galactic Cowboys albums